Alcithoe fusus is a species of medium-sized sea snail, a marine gastropod mollusc in the family Volutidae, the volutes.

References

 Powell A W B, New Zealand Mollusca, William Collins Publishers Ltd, Auckland, New Zealand 1979 
 Glen Pownall, New Zealand Shells and Shellfish, Seven Seas Publishing Pty Ltd, Wellington, New Zealand 1979 

Volutidae
Gastropods of New Zealand
Gastropods described in 1833